The Guðbrand's Bible (full title: Biblia þad er Øll heilog ritning, vtlögd a norrænu. Med formalum doct. Martini Lutheri. Prentad a Holum/Af Jone Jons Syne) was the first translation of the full Bible into the Icelandic language.

The translation was published in 1584 by Guðbrandur Þorláksson, Lutheran bishop of Hólar. The Old Testament translation was based on Martin Luther's 1534 full German translation and Christian III's 1550 Danish translation. The New Testament used Oddur Gottskálksson's 1540 translation with corrections. It is believed that Oddur translated the Psalms and Gissur Einarsson translated the Book of Proverbs and Book of Sirach. It is possible Guðbrandur himself translated other books of the Old Testament.

References

External links 
 Read online
 The Gudbrand Bible, 1584, HM The Queen's Reference Library

16th century in Iceland
History of Christianity in Iceland
1584 books
Bible versions and translations